34th Street may refer to:
 34th Street (Manhattan), a major cross-town street in New York City
 34th Street Magazine, a weekly arts and entertainment magazine by The Daily Pennsylvanian, the student newspaper of the University of Pennsylvania
34th Street station (disambiguation), stations of the name

See also
Miracle on 34th Street (disambiguation)